The Earth Tour: 21 Nights in London was a concert residency at the O2 arena in London by American recording artist Prince that commenced on 1 August 2007 and concluded on 21 September 2007. Tickets for all 21 nights were sold-out. 

The residency was announced at a press conference on 8 May 2007. It was nominally in support of his recently released Planet Earth album which had been distributed in the UK for free with copies of The Mail on Sunday newspaper on 15 July 2007, although the performances themselves primarily concentrated on earlier hits. Tickets for the concerts were priced at £31.21, echoing the title of Prince's 2006 album 3121. 

The show featured Prince and his band playing "in the round" on a stage in the shape of Prince’s iconic Love Symbol #2 in the centre of the arena, surrounded by the audience. The set list changed nightly as Prince used code-words to direct his band to his next song choice (from a list of 200 songs that they had rehearsed in advance) on the fly. The concerts were followed by an after-party held at the neighbouring IndigO2 venue, also housed within the O2 facility, and which often saw Prince continue to perform, although these appearances were not guaranteed. 

The Earth Tour remains the longest residency to have been held at the venue. The total audience attendance at the concerts was over 351,000.

Set list
Opening night set list
 UK Music Hall of Fame video intro
 "Purple Rain"
 "Girls & Boys" (includes "D.M.S.R." interpolation)
 "Satisfied"
 "Cream"
 "U Got the Look"
 "Shhh"
 "Musicology"
 "I Feel for You"
 "Controversy" (includes "Housequake" interpolation)
 "What a Wonderful World" (Instrumental) (performed by Renato Neto and Mike Phillips)
 "Somewhere Here on Earth"
 "Lolita"
 "Black Sweat"
 "Kiss"
 "If I Was Your Girlfriend"
 "Pink Cashmere" (includes "The One U Wanna C" lyrics)
 "7"
 "Come Together"
 "Take Me with U"
 "Guitar" 
 "Planet Earth" 
 "Crazy" (includes "One Nation Under a Groove" interpolation, performed by Shelby J.)
 "Nothing Compares 2 U"
 "Let's Go Crazy"
 "Little Red Corvette" (Solo guitar set)
 "Raspberry Beret" (Solo guitar set)
 "Sometimes It Snows in April" (Solo guitar set)
 "Get on the Boat"
 "A Love Bizarre"
 "Sexy Dancer"/"Le Freak" (vocals by Shelby J. and Marva King)

Band lineup

Shows

References

Prince (musician) concert tours
2007 concert residencies